Charles Osborne may refer to:

Charles Osborne (politician), MP (1759–1817), Irish politician and judge
Sir Charles Osborne, 14th Baronet (1825–1879), Irish baronet of the Osborne baronets
Charles Osborne (American football) (ca. 1885 – ? ), American football player and coach
Charles Nelson Osborne better known as Uncle Charlie Osborne (1890–1992), American folk musician
Charles Osborne (hiccups) (1894–1991), American citizen who suffered from hiccups for 68 years
Charles Osborne (music writer) (1927–2017), Australian-born writer on classical music and of Agatha Christie adaptations
Chuck Osborne (1939–1979), American professional basketball player
Chuck Osborne (American football) (1973–2012), American football player

See also
Charles Creagh-Osborne (1823–1892), British Army officer 
Charles F. Osborn (1847–?), American politician